Wanchainoi Sitsarawatseur is a Thai Muay Thai fighter.

Titles and accomplishments
Professional Boxing Association of Thailand (PAT) 
 2018 Thailand 112 lbs Champion
Lumpinee Stadium
 2018 Lumpinee Stadium 108 lbs Champion
 2018 Lumpinee Stadium Rising Star of the Year
Thailand Regional titles 
 2013 Nakhon Phanom 27 kg Champion
 2014 Isaan 29 kg Champion
 2015 Isaan 32 kg Champion

Awards
 2018 Golden Glove Muay Thai Fighter of the Year

Fight record

|-  style="background:#fbb;"
| 2019-12-10|| Loss||align=left| Petchphailin SorJor.TongPrachin || PK Saenchai + SorJor.TongPrachin, Lumpinee Stadium || Bangkok, Thailand ||Decision ||5  || 3:00
|-  style="background:#cfc;"
| 2019-11-05|| Win||align=left| Samuenthep Por Petchsiri || Kiatpetch, Lumpinee Stadium || Bangkok, Thailand ||KO ||3  ||
|-  style="background:#cfc;"
| 2019-09-06|| Win||align=left| Chusap Sor.Salacheep || Kiatpetch, Lumpinee Stadium || Bangkok, Thailand ||KO ||4  ||
|-  style="background:#fbb;"
| 2019-05-28|| Loss||align=left| Seeuy Singmawin || PK Saenchai + SorJor.TongPrachin, Lumpinee Stadium || Bangkok, Thailand ||Decision ||5  || 3:00
|-  style="background:#fbb;"
| 2019-03-26|| Loss ||align=left| Seeuy Singmawin  || Parunchai Birthday + Kiatpetch Super Fight || Thung Song District, Thailand || Decision ||5  || 3:00
|-  style="background:#fbb;"
| 2019-03-03|| Loss ||align=left| PetchAmnat Sawansangmanja || Channel 7 Boxing Stadium || Thung Song District, Thailand || Decision ||5  || 3:00
|-  style="background:#cfc;"
| 2019-01-29|| Win||align=left| Numtrangnoi Singpomprab || Kiatpetch, Lumpinee Stadium || Bangkok, Thailand ||Decision ||5 ||3:00
|-  style="background:#cfc;"
| 2018-12-11|| Win||align=left| Chokplerngrit Por.Lakboon || PKsaenchai, Lumpinee Stadium || Bangkok, Thailand ||Decision ||5 ||3:00
|-
! style=background:white colspan=9 |
|-  style="background:#cfc;"
| 2018-11-09|| Win||align=left| Robocop RadGoldGym || Petchkiatpetch, Lumpinee Stadium || Bangkok, Thailand ||Decision ||5 ||3:00
|-  style="background:#cfc;"
| 2018-10-19|| Win||align=left| Patakpetch SinbiMuayThai || Petchkiatpetch, Lumpinee Stadium || Bangkok, Thailand ||Decision ||5 ||3:00
|-  style="background:#cfc;"
| 2018-09-07|| Win||align=left| Seeuy Singmawin || Kiatpetch, Lumpinee Stadium || Bangkok, Thailand ||Decision ||5 ||3:00
|-
! style=background:white colspan=9 |
|-  style="background:#cfc;"
| 2018-06-29|| Win||align=left| Nengern PKsaenchaimuaythaigym || PKsaenchai, Lumpinee Stadium || Bangkok, Thailand ||Decision ||5 ||3:00
|-  style="background:#cfc;"
| 2018-06-05|| Win||align=left| Saenchainoi Thanaimichel || Kruekrai, Lumpinee Stadium || Bangkok, Thailand ||Decision ||5 ||3:00
|-
! style=background:white colspan=9 |
|-  style="background:#cfc;"
| 2018-05-01|| Win||align=left| Petchrungruang Odtuekdaeng || Kiatpetch, Lumpinee Stadium || Bangkok, Thailand ||Decision ||5 ||3:00
|-  style="background:#cfc;"
| 2018-03-28|| Win||align=left| Hongkhao Erawan || WanParunchai + Poonseua Sanjorn || Nakhon Si Thammarat, Thailand ||Decision ||5 ||3:00
|-  style="background:#fbb;"
| 2018-03-04|| Loss ||align=left| Petchrungruang Odtuekdaeng || Channel 7 Boxing Stadium || Bangkok, Thailand ||Decision ||5 ||3:00
|-  style="background:#cfc;"
| 2018-01-20|| Win||align=left| Grandprixnoi Sitnayokanong || Kiatpetch, Lumpinee Stadium || Bangkok, Thailand ||Decision ||5 ||3:00
|-  style="background:#fbb;"
| 2017-12-03|| Loss ||align=left| Taenchai SantiUbon || Muay7see, Channel 7 Boxing Stadium || Bangkok, Thailand ||Decision ||5 ||3:00
|-  style="background:#cfc;"
| 2017-11-02|| Win||align=left| Tongpoon Sitpanuntchueng ||  || Thailand ||Decision ||5 ||3:00
|-  style="background:#cfc;"
| 2017-09-16|| Win||align=left| Kaoponglek Huarongnamkeng || Lumpine TKO, Lumpinee Stadium || Bangkok, Thailand ||KO ||3 ||
|-  style="background:#fbb;"
| 2017-08-08|| Loss||align=left| Grandprixnoi Sitnayokanong || Eminent Air, Lumpinee Stadium || Bangkok, Thailand ||Decision ||5 ||3:00
|-  style="background:#fbb;"
| 2017-06-30|| Loss ||align=left| Taenchai SantiUbon || Kiatpetch, Lumpinee Stadium || Bangkok, Thailand ||Decision ||5 ||3:00
|-  style="background:#cfc;"
| 2017-06-06|| Win ||align=left| Faahkamram Petchpayatai || Petchkiatpetch, Lumpinee Stadium || Bangkok, Thailand ||Decision ||5 ||3:00
|-  style="background:#fbb;"
| 2017-05-09|| Loss ||align=left| Petchpanran BigMgym || Trakoonyang, Lumpinee Stadium || Bangkok, Thailand ||Decision ||5 ||3:00
|-  style="background:#cfc;"
| 2017-03-28|| Win ||align=left| Kowpong Por.Petchmanee || PK.Saenchai, Lumpinee Stadium || Bangkok, Thailand ||Decision ||5 ||3:00
|-  style="background:#cfc;"
| 2017-02-21|| Win ||align=left| Faahkamram Petchpayatai || Kiatpetch+Sitnumnoi, Lumpinee Stadium || Bangkok, Thailand ||Decision ||5 ||3:00
|-  style="background:#fbb;"
| 2017-01-15|| Loss ||align=left| Tapaokaew Singmawynn || Channel 7 Boxing Stadium || Bangkok, Thailand ||Decision ||5 ||3:00
|-  style="background:#fbb;"
| 2016-12-09|| Loss ||align=left| Kradooklek Kor.Klomkleaw || Lumpinee Stadium || Bangkok, Thailand ||Decision ||5 ||3:00
|-  style="background:#cfc;"
| 2016-11-15|| Win ||align=left| Saenchainoi Thanaimichel || Lumpinee Stadium || Bangkok, Thailand ||Decision ||5 ||3:00
|-  style="background:#fbb;"
| 2016-10-09|| Loss ||align=left| Saksit Kiatmoo9|| Channel 7 Boxing Stadium || Bangkok, Thailand ||Decision ||5 ||3:00
|-  style="background:#cfc;"
| 2016-08-02|| Win ||align=left| Palangpup Phor.Muangphet || Lumpinee Stadium || Bangkok, Thailand ||Decision ||5 ||3:00
|-  style="background:#cfc;"
| 2016-06-28|| Win ||align=left| Saenchainoi Thanaimichel || Lumpinee Stadium || Bangkok, Thailand ||Decision ||5 ||3:00
|-  style="background:#cfc;"
| 2016-05-10|| Win ||align=left| Off Side Huarongnamkeng || Lumpinee Stadium || Bangkok, Thailand ||Decision ||5 ||3:00
|-  style="background:#fbb;"
| 2016-03-10|| Loss ||align=left| DT Lookbanmai || Rajadamnern Stadium || Bangkok, Thailand ||Decision ||5 ||3:00
|-  style="background:#cfc;"
| 2016-02-14|| Win ||align=left| DT Lookbanmai || Rangsit Stadium || Thailand ||Decision ||5 ||3:00
|-  style="background:#fbb;"
| 2016-01-03|| Loss ||align=left| Ninmangkon Or.SbayThae || Channel 7 Boxing Stadium || Bangkok, Thailand ||Decision ||5 ||3:00
|-  style="background:#fbb;"
| 2015-12-04|| Loss ||align=left| Komphetlek Adisorn || Lumpinee Stadium || Bangkok, Thailand ||Decision ||5 ||3:00
|-  style="background:#cfc;"
| 2016-10-13|| Win ||align=left| Yokkeeree T.N. Muaythai Gym || Lumpinee Stadium || Bangkok, Thailand ||Decision ||5 ||3:00
|-  style="background:#cfc;"
| 2015-09-14|| Win ||align=left| Phitakchai Sor.Kitichai || Rajadamnern Stadium || Bangkok, Thailand ||Decision ||5 ||3:00
|-  style="background:#cfc;"
| 2015-07-21|| Win ||align=left| Phitakchai Sor.Kitichai || Lumpinee Stadium || Bangkok, Thailand ||Decision ||5 ||3:00
|-  style="background:#fbb;"
| 2015-06-19|| Loss ||align=left| Phitakchai Sor.Kitichai || Lumpinee Stadium || Bangkok, Thailand ||Decision ||5 ||3:00
|-  style="background:#fbb;"
| 2015-05-10|| Loss ||align=left| Tai Parunchai || Jitmuangnon Stadium || Thailand ||Decision ||5 ||3:00
|-  style="background:#fbb;"
| 2016-02-16|| Loss ||align=left| Theppratan Phetsitong || Rajadamnern Stadium || Bangkok, Thailand ||Decision ||5 ||3:00
|-  style="background:#cfc;"
| 2015-11-24|| Win ||align=left| Tongsiam Lukmahata || Rajadamnern Stadium || Bangkok, Thailand ||Decision ||5 ||3:00
|-  style="background:#cfc;"
| 2014-08-15|| Win ||align=left| Petchthailand Moopingaroijung ||  || Maha Sarakham, Thailand ||Decision ||5 ||3:00
|-
|-
| colspan=9 | Legend:

References

Wanchainoi Sitsarawatseur
Living people
2001 births
Wanchainoi Sitsarawatseur